The Class 68 is a type of mainline mixed traffic diesel-electric locomotive manufactured by Stadler Rail (and previously by Vossloh España) for Direct Rail Services (DRS) in the United Kingdom. The design is derived from the Stadler Eurolight, and Stadler's product name for this variant is the UKLight.

On 5 January 2012, DRS announced the placement of an order for fifteen Class 68 locomotives, the first of which arriving in the UK during January 2014. The first batch of Class 68s was quickly followed by a second batch, also intended for DRS and the first to be built by Stadler; the delivery of these units was completed during April 2016. A third batch of Class 68s was also ordered, deliveries of which were completed during July 2017. The Class 68 has since been followed by two related locomotives, the Class 88 and Class 93.

Since its introduction in 2014, the Class 68 has been used on numerous passenger and freight operations, including DRS's nuclear flask trains. In addition to DRS's freight operations, the operator has also used the type to haul various charter trains. Several units have been subleased to other operators, including Chiltern Railways, Abellio ScotRail, and TransPennine Express, for passenger services, hauling various rakes of carriages to do so, in some cases being outfitted with Association of American Railroads (AAR) push-pull apparatus.

Background

Origins

During the 2000s, the British train operating company Direct Rail Services (DRS) recognised that its small fleet of British Rail Class 20 diesel locomotives were increasingly outdated and suffering from ever-decreasing viability as a result of the very low numbers still in service with any operator. Accordingly, management examined several alternatives that could potentially be operated with greater profitability while also being practical for the company's core business of transporting nuclear materials by rail. While DRS did acquire newer diesel traction, such as the ubiquitous British Rail Class 66 locomotive, these did not satisfactorily fill the Class 20's niche, partly due to Class 66's two-stroke engine being somewhat inefficient compared with some alternatives and unable to satisfy the latest EU emission standards. It also incurs a higher operating cost than several contemporary locomotives, along with a relatively high rate of wheelset wear and a less than hospitable cab environment. Thus, there were doubts over the suitability of the Class 66s for hauling nuclear waste trains.

In light of these factors, by 2009, DRS were convinced that a clean-sheet approach would be needed for its technical requirements, with management intended to not only support the business' core activities but without any subsidy but also increase its locomotive fleet. One stated requirement for the envisioned locomotive would be to satisfy the bulk of DRS’s traction needs through to 2036. Various manufacturers and their platforms were examined, including Brush Traction, General Electric, Bombardier, Siemens, with particular attention paid to the British Rail Class 70. However, the relatively small quantity sought by DRS proved to be an adverse condition during this search. The rolling stock leasing company Beacon Rail suggested approaching the Swiss manufacturer Stadler Rail, who was relatively receptive of the construction of a bespoke locomotive to meet DRS's needs based upon its existing Eurolight platform.

To explore the concept in detail, Stadler produced a modified EUROLight demonstrator that conformed with the relatively restricted dimensions imposed by the British loading gauge as well as the specification produced by DRS, and subjected it to tests at the Velim railway test circuit in the Czech Republic. Areas of modification extended beyond the physical bodyshell and the mechanical systems, as British railway regulations necessitated wiring changes and the fitted equipment. The development effort, which took roughly 18months from start to finish, was greatly aided by the firm's experience from prior work undertaken in the manufacture of the British Rail Class 67 locomotive. Stadler's performance and responsiveness to DRS' interest led to the latter placing its confidence in the former.

As a result of another DRS stipulation, an electric train supply was incorporated into the UKLight's power train, capable of supplying up to 500kW so that large trains, such as a British Rail Class 390, could be readily hauled. The locomotive's propulsion system is compliant with Stage III A of the European emission standards, but not the more stringent Stage III B requirements. While DRS had envisioned their ideal locomotive using a Co-Co wheel arrangement, the performance demonstrated by the EUROLight demonstrator at Velim was such to convince the company that the requirement could be satisfactorily fulfilled using a four-axle traction unit. This is partially a consequence of its relatively low centre of gravity and its balanced and evenly spread weight, which to minimise weight transfer between the axles when pulling heavy trains and helps ensure a consistent delivery of the maximum tractive effort.

Order and production
On 5 January 2012, DRS announced it had placed an order with Stadler for fifteen  Eurolight locomotives for both intermodal and passenger work; these would be leased from Beacon Rail and the first example to be delivered during late 2013. The value of the contract has been estimated at £45million. During February 2013, it was announced that the locomotives were to be known as the Class 68 under TOPS; while Stadler refer to the design by its product name of UKLight.

Placement of this first order to delivery of the first Class 68 locomotive took 28months. The UKLight's detailed design had not been finalised at the time of the order; according to rail industry periodical Rail, it took four months to select the power train. The selected powerplant was a single 16-cylinder  C175-16 engine supplied by Caterpillar Inc.; this was paired with an ABB-built traction package incorporating a six-pole brushless synchronous alternator and two ABB Bordline CC1500 DE compact converters, which use rectifiers to generate an intermediate DC supply, braking chopper, and to power onboard electronics. The Class 68 incorporates an identical vehicle control unit and driver’s advisory system to those fitted on the standard EUROLight platform. It has proved to be compliant with DRS's relatively stringent adhesion demands, and that it can achieve a maximum tractive effort of 317kN.

The first locomotive, 68001, underwent several months of testing at Velim Test Centre in the Czech Republic prior to being shipped to the UK. Thus, during January 2014, the second locomotive in the class, 68002, was the first to arrive in the UK.

An option for ten further locomotives was confirmed to have been taken up in September 2014. Further to this, on 28 July 2015, Vossloh España announced an order for a further seven locomotives from DRS.

Current operations

Direct Rail Services

The Class 68 is a mixed-traffic locomotive intended for use on both passenger and freight trains. Customer trials of the type commenced during February 2014, which were initially conducted between Carlisle and Crewe. During mid-2014, DRS indicated that the type were be typically operated on container traffic, as well as on Network Rail trains for which the company has been contracted to operate.

Furthermore, the type is routinely used on DRS nuclear flask trains. According to Rail, operations of the Class 68 has proved it to be a highly effective locomotive.

Chiltern Railways

These locomotives have been painted in Chiltern's silver Mainline livery and are fitted with Association of American Railroads (AAR) push-pull equipment, which allows them to operate with Mark 3 coaching stock sets. Furthermore, two DRS-liveried locomotives (68008 and 68009) have also been fitted with AAR push-pull equipment.

TransPennine Express
Once more sets are delivered and staff have been trained they will also work  to  services. These will haul five-car rakes of Mark 5A coaches, with a driving trailer at the opposite end.

The TPE-vinyled locomotives do not feature yellow front ends, following a change to the regulations. In April 2020, locomotives 68033 and 68034 were added to the TPE pool, to provide added resilience to the sub-fleet. In November 2017, 68021 Tireless was moved from the Crewe Gresty Lane TMD to Southampton Docks and ultimately transported to the Velim Test Track in the Czech Republic for testing with the new Mark 5A coaches. Testing included brake-force tests and door-interlock testing before the locomotive was returned to Great Britain in July 2018.

Former operations

Abellio ScotRail
Abellio ScotRail sub-leased two Class 68s, to haul sets of six Mark 2 coaches, for use on peak hour services on the Fife Circle Line. These were 68006 and 68007, which carried the Saltire livery. These services commenced on 1 April 2015, the first day of Abellio Scotrail operation, with the last service operating on 29 May 2020 as the PRM-TSI derogations for the non-compliant Mark 2 coaches ended on 31 May of that year.

Fleet

Before delivery, each of the first nine locomotives was named. All of the other Class 68 locomotives (except 68011, 68012 and 68014) have also been named. Locomotive 68010 was named Oxford Flyer on 12 December 2016, in celebration of Chiltern Railways new London-Oxford services. Locomotive 68033 was named The Poppy in honour of the 100th anniversary of the Royal British Legion on 30 October 2021, in a ceremony at London Euston. Locomotive 68006 was renamed Pride of the North as a tribute to the work that DRS do in Northern England and Scotland.

Named locomotives
The names given to Class 68 locomotives are as follows:

Liveries

See also

References

External links

 

68
Bo-Bo locomotives
Railway locomotives introduced in 2013
Macosa/Meinfesa/Vossloh Espana locomotives
Standard gauge locomotives of Great Britain
Diesel-electric locomotives of Great Britain